Canal Mania was the period of intense canal building in England and Wales between the 1790s and 1810s, and the speculative frenzy that ensued in the early 1790s.

Background
The earliest canal building was undertaken as a local enterprise, usually by a merchant, manufacturer or mine owner needing to ship goods, such as the Duke of Bridgewater's canal, built to ship his coal from Worsley to Manchester.

Despite the high cost of construction, the price of coal in Manchester fell by 50% shortly after it opened, and the financial success was attractive to investors.

The expensive American War of Independence ended in 1783. A long run of good harvests resulted in an increase in disposable income and an increase in the number of people looking to invest capital for a profit with little personal interest in the business. This resulted in an increase in less cautious speculation.

There was a dramatic rise in the number of schemes promoted. Only one canal was authorised by Act of Parliament in 1790, but by 1793 it was twenty. The capital authorised in 1790 was £90,000 (£ in 2015), but this had risen to £2,824,700 (£ in 2015) by 1793.

Some of the canals authorized during this period went on to be profitable. However, there were a number, including the Herefordshire and Gloucestershire Canal, which never paid a dividend. Others, such as the Grand Western Canal, were never completed.

See also

History of the British canal system
Canals of the United Kingdom
Balloonomania
Railway Mania
Bike boom
Dot-com bubble
Timeline of transportation technology

References

Economic bubbles
Canals in Wales
Mania
1790s in transport 
1790s in England